Vayrij (also Romanized as Vayrīj and Varīj; also known as Darīj) is a village in Fordu Rural District, Kahak District, Qom County, Qom Province, Iran. At the 2006 census, its population was 181, in 52 families.

References 

Populated places in Qom Province